Skilligan's Island is the fourth studio album by American rapper Thirstin Howl III, who also served as producer and executive producer for the album. It was released on July 23, 2002 through Landspeed Records.

History 
Skilligan's Island was also produced by Steve Boston, P.F. Cuttin' (who also mixed the album), DJ Spinna (who also mixed the album along with P.F. Cuttin'), and Will Tell. Guest appearances on this album include Disco, Unique London, Big Boo, Rack-Lo, Master Fool, Cita, Eminem, Father Time, and God Forbid, among others.

This album was composed by Thirstin Howl III, L. Michael Smith, Angel Cruz, and Eminem, as credited for the album on AllMusic.

Track listing

Personnel

Chart positions

References

2002 albums
Thirstin Howl III albums